The Ambassador Extraordinary and Plenipotentiary of the Russian Federation to the Republic of Angola is the official representative of the President and the Government of the Russian Federation to the President and the Government of Angola.

The ambassador and his staff work at large in the Embassy of Russia in Luanda. Since 1992 the ambassador to Angola has had dual accreditation to São Tomé and Príncipe.

History of diplomatic relations

Diplomatic relations at the mission level between the Soviet Union and Angola were first established in November 1975. The first ambassador, was appointed on 3 March 1976, and presented his credentials on 16 April 1976. With the dissolution of the Soviet Union in 1991, the Soviet ambassador, continued as representative of the Russian Federation until 1995.

List of representatives (1976 – present)

Representatives of the Soviet Union to Angola (1976 – 1991)

Representatives of the Russian Federation to Angola (1991 – present)

References

 
Angola
Russia